Svitjodbreen is a glacier in Albert I Land at Spitsbergen, Svalbard. The glacier is located centrally on the peninsula of Vasahalvøya. It debouches northwards into the head of Fuglefjorden, and has also several offsprings in other directions.

References 

Glaciers of Spitsbergen